Zen Bound is a puzzle game for the iOS, Android, and Maemo platforms (Nokia N900), developed by Secret Exit. It was announced on September 5, 2008 via the company's discussion board, and officially released via the App Store on February 24, 2009, and via Ovi Store on June 16, 2010. A port to Android was announced as part of the Humble Bundle for Android 2 on March 19, 2012. The game has received press attention for its unique gameplay. A lite version of the game was also released for free which featured 2 levels of the game. A sequel, Zen Bound 2, was released for iOS on April 1, 2010, for Steam on November 16, 2010, and for the Nintendo Switch in Europe and North America on May 24, 2018.

Gameplay
The goal of the game is to paint various objects. In each level the player is given an object with an attached rope which varies in length depending on the level. Using a mouse or touch screen and tilt controls, the player attempts to wrap the object with the rope. Each time the rope is laid down on the object, the area near the rope gets covered by paint. The challenge is getting the required percentage of an object painted with only a finite length of rope. There are three targets in each level - minimum, medium and maximum coverage.

Some levels require nails protruding from the objects to be entwined in rope rather than having to cover the object's surface.

Reception

Zen Bound

Zen Bound received universal acclaim according to the review aggregation website GameRankings.

Awards
5th IMGAwards (International Mobile Gaming Awards) (2008): Excellence in 3D

Zen Bound 2

Zen Bound 2 received "favorable" reviews on all platforms according to the review aggregation website Metacritic.

Abandonment
Neither Zen Bound nor its sequel are available for purchase in the Apple App Store or the Google Play Store; however, Zen Bound 2 remains available via Steam and the Nintendo eStore as of April 2022.

References

External links
Zen Bound official website
Secret Exit official website
Zen Bound page (IMGAwards)

2009 video games
Android (operating system) games
Chillingo games
IOS games
Linux games
MacOS games
Maemo games
Nintendo Switch games
Puzzle video games
Single-player video games
Video games developed in Finland
Windows games